Bilehverdi may refer to:
 Bilehverdi, East Azerbaijan
 Bilehverdi, West Azerbaijan